is a professional Japanese baseball player. He plays catcher for the Tokyo Yakult Swallows.

References 

1998 births
Living people
Baseball people from Fukuoka Prefecture
Japanese baseball players
Nippon Professional Baseball catchers
Tokyo Yakult Swallows players